The 2014 CEV Moto2 European Championship was the fifth CEV Moto2 season. The season was held over 10 races at 7 meetings, began on 6 April at Jerez and finished on 16 November at Valencia.

Calendar

Entry list

Championship standings

References

External links
 

FIM CEV Moto2 European Championship
CEV Moto2
CEV Moto2